Hurchel "Trey" E. Caldwell III (born December 24, 1988) is an American politician serving as a member of the Oklahoma House of Representatives from the 63rd district. Elected in November 2018, he assumed office on January 14, 2019. He is Choctaw.

Early life and education 
Caldwell is a native of Oklahoma. He graduated from MacArthur High School and earned a Bachelor of Arts degree from Cameron University in 2013.

Career 
Outside of politics, Caldwell has worked as a financial advisor for Merrill Lynch. He was elected to the Oklahoma House of Representatives in November 2018 and assumed office on January 14, 2019. During the 2019–2020 legislative session, he served as vice chair of the House Energy & Natural Resources Committee. He has since served as vice chair of the House Business and Commerce Committee.

References 

1988 births
21st-century American politicians
21st-century Native American politicians
Cameron University alumni
Living people
Republican Party members of the Oklahoma House of Representatives
Choctaw Nation of Oklahoma state legislators in Oklahoma